Arizona's 27th Legislative District is one of 30 in the state, situated in south central Maricopa County. As of 2021, there are 37 precincts in the district, with a total registered voter population of 115,067. The district has an overall population of 229,588.

Political representation
The district is represented for the 2021–2022 Legislative Session in the State Senate by Rebecca Rios (D, Phoenix) and in the House of Representatives by Reginald Bolding (D, Phoenix) and Marcelino Quiñonez (D, Phoenix).

References

Maricopa County, Arizona
Arizona legislative districts